Delhi Mapillai is a 1968 Indian Tamil-language comedy film directed by Devan. It stars Ravichandran, Rajasree and Sachu. The film revolves around two sons teaching a lesson to their father who disregards the poor. It was released on 13 September 1968.

Plot

Cast 
 Ravichandran
 Rajasree
 Sachu
 V. K. Ramasamy
 Cho
 Manorama
 O. A. K. Thevar
 Suruli Rajan

Soundtrack 
The music was composed by K. V. Mahadevan.

References

External links 
 

1968 films
1960s Tamil-language films
Films scored by K. V. Mahadevan